Hassi Ehel Ahmed Bechna  is a village and rural commune in Mauritania.

Communes of Mauritania